Äiwoo is an Oceanic language spoken on the Santa Cruz Islands and the Reef Islands in the Temotu Province of the Solomon Islands.

Name
The Äiwoo language has been known under many names in the literature, including: Aŷiwo, Ayiwo, Aïwo, Gnivo, Lanlom, Lomlom, Naaude, Nifilole, Nivo, Reef Islands, and Reefs.

Speakers and distribution
Äiwoo has roughly 8,400 native speakers with roughly 5,000-6,000 of these living on the Reef islands and the rest living on the Santa Cruz islands. As such, Äiwoo is the largest of the Reef Islands – Santa Cruz languages. Most speakers live on the Ngawa and Ngäsinue islands in the Reef Islands; others live in some villages on Vanikoro or on Nendö, like Kala Bay. Finally, some communities have recently been established in the capital Honiara, notably in the White River district.

Sociolinguistics 
On the Reef islands, Äiwoo is the primary language spoken by all of its people. Most of them also speak Pijin, the lingua franca of the Solomon Islands, while only a few people also speak English. The schooling system uses Äiwoo on the primary and secondary school level, though a standardized orthography for Äiwoo has not yet been adopted, resulting in a decline of people who can read and write.

Phonology

Consonants 

 Voiced stops are prenasalized by default, but can be realized plain oral: e.g. // is realized [] ~ [].
 The voiced labio-dental approximant // may also be realized as a fricative [].
 // can also be heard as an affricate [].
 // can also be heard as rhotic sounds [, ] within words.

Vowels

Orthography 
Äiwoo uses a variation of the Latin alphabet. The following spelling conventions are taken from Næss’ dictionary of Äiwoo.

Note that Äiwoo distinguishes ä [æ] and â [ɑ,ɒ], both of which appear in the word kânongä 'I want'.

Word classes

Nouns 
Nouns are used to describe a person, place or thing. Nouns in Äiwoo can be paired with a suffix to show a possessive case. An example of this is tumo 'my father'. Other nouns in Äiwoo can be followed by a possessive particle, as in kuli nou 'my dog'.

Bound nouns 
One subtype of nouns is the bound nouns. Bound nouns act like nouns but they cannot be used by themselves but need to be paired with a verb, possessive case, or another noun instead.

Local nouns 
Another subtype of nouns is called local nouns. Local nouns are not like regular nouns because they can be used to indicate a location without the preposition

Verbs 
Verbs in Äiwoo are divided into three different classes: intransitive verbs, A-verbs, and O-verbs.

Intransitive verbs 
These combine only with one noun or pronoun to form a sentence but also take a prefix to indicate an action.

A-Verbs 
Similarly to intransitive verbs, A-verbs take a prefix to indicate an action; however, they combine with another noun or pronoun.

O-Verbs 
Different from intransitive verbs, O-verbs take suffixes to say who is performing the action with the noun and pronoun.

Phonological structure of verbs 
There are no verbs that start with the sounds a, ä, â, or o. The majority of verbs in Äiwoo begin with the phoneme /e/ followed by a vowel, as e.g. eâmoli ‘to look’.

Verbal derivation 
Verbs beginning with the phonemes /v/ and /w/ are defined as causative verbs. Causative verbs are made by combining a causative prefix to the letters /v/ and /w/. In the Äiwoo language, the two causative prefixes are wâ- and vä-.

Prepositions 
In the Äiwoo language, ngä and go are two important prepositions. ngä translates to 'in, at, on, to, from', while go corresponds to 'for, with, because of'.

Pronouns 
Pronouns are words that take the place of nouns. An example of a pronoun is iu ‘I’.

Possessive Markers 
Possessive markers are used after a noun to show the possessor of a person, place or thing.

Relational markers 
Similarly to possessive markers, relational markers are used to show relations between a noun and something else.

Demonstratives 
Äiwoo demonstrative can cover several syntactic functions, but all share the property of distinguishing between a ‘here, close by’ and a ‘there, far away’ form.

Conjunctions 
Conjunctions are used to link together phrases or clauses.

Quantifiers 
Quantifiers are words that are used to show quantity.

Interjections 
Interjections are adjectives that are used by themselves without the need of other descriptives words.

Morphology

Intransitive subject forms 
In the Äiwoo language, lu- and li- are closely related to the verb stem and are thus the oldest subject prefixes still used. The other subject prefixes that follow after lu- and li- are newer, created other syntactic roles. However, one exclusion to the list of new subject prefixes are with i.

Transitive subject forms 
Transitive subject forms are suffixed. In addition, transitive subject forms have possessive-like forms.

Nominalizing prefixes 
There are eight different nominalizing prefixes that are combined with a verb to create a noun which describes a person, thing, or place. These prefixes are:

Class prefixes 
In the Äiwoo language, class prefixes are combined with a noun or verb.

Gender marking prefixes 
Äiwoo gender marking prefixes can be traced back to their Oceanic origin. To create a gender marking prefix, gi- and si- from the nominalizing prefixes are combined with nouns.

Syntax 
The Äiwoo language follows the word order OVS or Object-Verb-Subject.

Transitivity 
In Äiwoo, three different verbal clauses are distinguished: intransitive, transitive, and semitransitive. The main difference between these three verbal clauses is that intransitives concern only one person while transitives and semitransitives concern more than one person.

In Oceanic languages, intransitive clauses follow the subject and verb format. Transitive clauses follow the order object, verb, subject. Semitransitive clauses use intransitive verbs with subject and object, resulting in a structured phrase order of subject, verb, object.

References

External links 
 Paradisec has a collection of Äiwoo recordings. They also have a collection of Stephen Wurm's recordings, which includes some Äiwoo material.

Bibliography

Languages of the Solomon Islands
Temotu languages